The 2006–07 season was the 50th season in RK Zamet’s history. It is their 6th successive season in the Dukat 1.HRL, and 30th successive top tier season.

First team squad

Goalkeeper
 1  Damir Bobanović
 12  Ivan Stevanović
 16  Ivan Pešić

Wingers
RW
 6  Dario Černeka
 8  Ivan Vrkljan
 13  Josip Crnić
LW
 4  Mateo Hrvatin
 14  Marko Erstić 

Line players
 2  Krunoslav Pipinić
 18  Anđelo Žeravica
 19  Marin Sakić

Back players
LB
 5  Jakov Gojun
 9  Ivan Ćosić
 10  Robert Savković
 18  Nikola Kosanović
CB
 6  Marijan Bašić
 17  Igor Marijanović
RB
 3  Vedran Banić
 7  Milan Uzelac (captain)
 11  Aleksandar Škorić
 19  Luka Bracanovic
 21  Vladimir Grujičić

Technical staff
  President: Petar Bracanović (until 7 Feb 2007)
  President: Zlatko Kolić (from 7 Feb 2007)
  Sports director: Damir Bogdanović (until Jan 2007)
  Sports director: Alvaro Načinović (from Jan 2007)
  Club Secretary: Daniela Juriša
  Head Coach: Mladen Prskalo (until 7 Feb 2007)
  Head Coach: Drago Žiljak (from 7 Feb 2007)
  Assistant Coach: Marin Mišković (from 24 Feb 2007)
  Fitness Coach: Emil Baltić
  Fizioterapist: Branimir Maričević
  Tehniko: Williams Černeka

Competitions

Overall

Dukat 1.HRL

Group B League table

Source: Rk-zamet.hr

Matches

League 12 table

Source: Rk-zamet.hr

Matches

Croatian Cup

Matches

Sources
HRS
Sport.net.hr 
Rk-zamet.hr

References

RK Zamet seasons
Handball in Croatia